is a principle local road that stretches from Sangenjaya, Setagaya to Nakamachi, Machida, Tokyo. Common names include "Setagaya-dori", "Tsukui-michi" and "Tsurukawa-kaido", etc.

Route description
The Tokyo and Kawasaki sections of the road have a length of 18,424 and 8,816 m respectively.

References

Roads in Tokyo
Roads in Kanagawa Prefecture
Prefectural roads in Japan